Mining law is the branch of law relating to the legal requirements  affecting minerals and mining. Mining law covers several basic topics, including the ownership of the mineral resource and who can work them. Mining is also affected by various regulations regarding the health and safety of miners, as well as the environmental impact of mining.

Topics

Ownership

An aspect of property law that is central to mining law is the question of who "owns" the mineral, such that they may legally extract it from the earth. This is often dependent on the type of mineral in question, the mining history of the jurisdiction, as well as the general background legal tradition and its treatment of property.

For instance, in many jurisdictions, rights to mine gold and silver are retained by the sovereign, as the two metals traditionally served as currency in many a given society.

Support

In addition to ownership of the mineral, the method of extraction may affect nearby property owners. Subsidence (be it dramatic or subtle) results when a mine (or similar area) collapses or drops, causing above or nearby structures to drop with it, often damaging or destroying them. The issue of support rights determines the legal rights and relationships between parties in these situations.

By country
Mining law varies both by the legal tradition of the jurisdiction, as well as the individual jurisdiction.

Mining law in German-speaking countries 
Mining law in Europe originated from medieval common law. From at least the 12th century, German kings claimed mining rights to silver and other metals, taking precedence over the local lords. But by the late Middle Ages, mining rights, known as the Bergregal were transferred from the king to territorial rulers. Initially, mining rights were granted orally or in writing by individuals. From the early 15th century, mining law was enacted by territorial rulers in the form of decrees or regulations (mining regulations or Bergordnungen), which often remained in force until the 19th century. A new, far-reaching, legal basis was created with the General Mining Act for the Prussian States of 1865 (Allgemeines Berggesetz für die Preußischen Staaten von 1865), which, with local variations, was adopted in Brunswick (1867), Bavaria (1869), Württemberg (1874), Baden (1890) and other countries. With the exception of the Kingdom of Saxony, where a similarly important legal statute, the General Mining Act of the Kingdom of Saxony (Allgemeines Berggesetz für das Königreich Sachsen) came into force on 16 June 1868, it became law in all the larger states of Germany.

Today
In Germany, under Article 74 (1) no. 11 of the Basic Law Basic Law, mining law is subject to concurrent legislation. The central legal standard is the Federal Mining Act (Bundesberggesetz).
In Austria the legal basis is quite similar to German law. The primary legislation since 1 January 1999 has been the Mineral Raw Material Act (Mineralrohstoffgesetz) or MinroG.
In Switzerland mining law is a cantonal business and governed by cantonal law.
Mining law in Liechtenstein is restricted to just a few minerals (metallic ores, fossil fuels and related materials like graphite, anthracite, stone coal, lignite, slate coal, asphalt, bitumen and mineral oils, sulphur, rock salt and salt springs) and governed mainly by the Liechtenstein Property Act, articles 484 to 497. As in Switzerland mining in Liechtenstein is no longer important and the regulations in the property act are largely only procedural regulations.

Mining law in English-speaking countries 
Unlike German mining law, in Great Britain and the Commonwealth the principle of mining by landowners prevails. The crown only lays claim to gold and silver reserves. In exceptional cases (e.g. where land ownership is divided) mining rights may be given to a third party, whereby the landowners have to be compensated. The mining company pays the landowner a lease, dead rent or a royalty. The rights to above- and below-ground minerals (as a rule quarries and mines) may be awarded separately.

Mining law in the United States is also based on English common law. Here the landowner is likewise the owner of all raw materials to unlimited depth. However, the state retains rights over phosphate, nitrate, potassium salts, asphalt, coal, oil shale and sulphur, and a right of appropriation (not ownership) by the state for oil and gas. Sand and gravel come under the Department of the Interior.

Mining law in French-speaking countries 
In France and Belgium the Code civil is the basis for mining law.

See also 

 Bergamt - German mining office
 Bergregal - Medieval mining rights and royalties
 Bergordnung - German mining regulations
 Law on Mining Concessions (Chile)
 Mining act
 General Mining Act of 1872 (United States)
 Minerals and Mining Law of 1986 (Ghana)

References

Literature 
 Reinhart Piens, Hans-Wolfgang Schulte, Stephan Graf Vitzthum: Bundesberggesetz. (BBergG). Kommentar. Kohlhammer Verlag, Stuttgart, 1983, .
 Raimund Willecke: Die Deutsche Berggesetzgebung. Von den Anfängen bis zur Gegenwart. Glückauf, Essen, 1977, .
 Eduard Kremer, Peter U. Neuhaus gen. Wever: Bergrecht. Kohlhammer Verlag, Stuttgart, u. a. 2001, .
 Julius Hesemann et al.: Untersuchung und Bewertung von Lagerstätten der Erze, nutzbarer Minerale und Gesteine (= Vademecum 1). Geologisches Landesamt Nordrhein-Westfalen, Krefeld, 1981, pp. 95–105: Abschnitt: Rechtsverhältnisse (Berggesetzgebung).

External links 
 Rechtliches.de: Bergrecht – Deutsche Rechtsnormen zum Bergrecht
 BMWFJ.gv.at: Rechtsgrundlagen Bergbau
 Entry about Austrian Mining Law at : Austria-Forum, dem österreichischen Wissensnetz – online  (auf AEIOU)